Khaidi No. 786 is a 1988 Indian Telugu-language film, starring Chiranjeevi, Bhanupriya, Suthivelu, Kota Srinivasa Rao, Mohan Babu, Nutan Prasad and Kaikala Satyanarayana. The film was directed by Vijaya Bapineedu. It is the second film in Chiranjeevi's successful Khaidi trilogy. The film is a remake of the 1986 Tamil film Amman Kovil Kizhakale, and was released on 10 June 1988.

Plot
Gopi (Chiranjeevi) is a music master brought up by Satyanarayana and Nutan Prasad in a village. He wants to become a police constable. Surya Chandra Rao (Kota Srinivasa Rao) is a rich man in the village with his daughter Radha (Bhanupriya), who is headstrong and proud of her riches. In a brawl with Gopi, she seeks revenge and acts as his disciple wanting to learn music and later accuses him of attempting to rape her with the help of the new SI of the village, Asirayya (Mohan Babu), but later realises her mistake and his good nature and falls in love with him. Though reluctant to marry her, Gopi is convinced to accept her into his life and they marry. Surya Chandra Rao is enraged by this and sends a goon to kill him and in the fight, the goon loses and Gopi leaves him at Surya Chandra Rao's house, warning him not to enter his life again. The goon is killed by Surya Chandra Rao and Gopi is accused of his murder and is put in jail. The rest of the story is formed on how Gopi proves his innocence and how he brings the villains to justice.

Cast

Soundtrack 
The soundtrack was Composed By Raj–Koti and Released by Aditya Music.

Trivia
The song "Guvva Gorinkato" was remixed in Sai Dharam Tej's Subramanyam for Sale (2015).

This is the second installment of the Khaidi franchise, the first being Khaidi released in 1983.

References

External links
 

1988 films
Films scored by Raj–Koti
Telugu remakes of Tamil films
1980s Telugu-language films